Dixon Edward Hoste (23 July 1861 – 11 May 1946) was a British Protestant Christian missionary to China and the longest lived of the Cambridge Seven. He became the successor to James Hudson Taylor as General Director of the China Inland Mission, (from 1902 to 1935).

Life
Hoste was born in 1861 as the son of Major General Dixon Edward Hoste. He was educated at Clifton College and the Royal Military Academy at Woolwich, and at the age of 18 was commissioned as a lieutenant in the Royal Artillery.  In 1882 he experienced a Christian conversion under the influence of Dwight Lyman Moody.

In 1883 he became interested in the work of the China Inland Mission, and was the first of the Cambridge Seven to apply to work with this mission, and after some delay he was accepted, sailing for China in 1885.  He was sent to Küwu (presumably Quwo), to the south of Linfen in Southern Shanxi.  In 1886, he was ordained as a pastor by Hudson Taylor, and moved to Hungtung (now Hongdong or Hongtong) to work with Stanley P. Smith (Peregrine) who had opened an opium refuge there at the invitation of Pastor Hsi. He worked under Hsi, wore Chinese clothes, ate Chinese food, and tried to get an insight into the Chinese mind. Hoste is credited with making the Chinese churches apply the indigenous principles of self-government, self-support, and self-propagation.

In 1893, he married Gertrude Broomhall, daughter of CIM General Secretary Benjamin Broomhall and his wife Amelia, (Hudson Taylor's sister). Because of ill-health Mr Hoste visited England in 1896 and then spent some time in Australia before returning to China.  During his appointment as general director of the China Inland Mission, he was based in Shanghai, and after internment there by the Japanese Army from 1944 to 1945, returned to England, where he died in 1946 at the Mildmay Nursing Home. He is buried in Islington Cemetery, London.  His wife had died in Shanghai on 12 April 1944.

Works
 36 Steps to Christian Leadership (1999)
 If I am to Lead (1968)
 The Insight of a Seer: Selections from the Writings of Hudson Taylor's Successor 
 Why I Have Joined the Bible Union of China (1921)

Quote

References

Further reading
Historical Bibliography of the China Inland Mission
Thompson, Phyllis, D. E. Hoste: A Prince with God (London: China Inland Mission, 1949)

1861 births
People educated at Clifton College
1946 deaths
British expatriates in China
British evangelicals
English Protestant missionaries
Protestant missionaries in China
English evangelicals
World War II civilian prisoners held by Japan